Raymond Harold Flaskamper (October 31, 1901 - February 3, 1978) was a Major League Baseball shortstop.

In March 1929 Flaskamper was sold by the San Antonio Bears to the Dallas Steers for $7,500.

References

External links

Major League Baseball shortstops
Chicago White Sox players
Miami Indians players
Independence Producers players
Vernon Tigers players
San Francisco Seals (baseball) players
Des Moines Boosters players
Lincoln Links players
San Antonio Bears players
Dallas Steers players
Memphis Chickasaws players
San Antonio Indians players
Oklahoma City Indians players
Longview Cannibals players
Henderson Oilers players
Baseball players from Missouri
1901 births
1978 deaths